Shabdatit Shantanu is a 1999 Nepali novel by poet Banira Giri. It was published in 1999 (2056 BS) by Sajha Prakashan and won the Sajha Puraskar for the same year, making Giri the first woman to win the award.

Synopsis 
The book is set in Lahan village and depicts the life of that place and other nearby places.

Reception 
The book won the prestigious Sajha Puraskar in 1999. Giri was the first woman to win the prize.

See also 

 Shirishko Phool
 Madhabi
 Yogmaya

References 

1999 novels
20th-century Nepalese novels
20th-century Nepalese books
Nepalese novels
Nepalese books
Sajha Puraskar-winning works
1999 Nepalese novels
Novels set in Nepal